More to Life: The Best of Stacie Orrico (also known as simply Best of Stacie Orrico) is a greatest hits album by American singer Stacie Orrico. It was released by EMI Music exclusively in Japan, on November 28, 2007. There is a deluxe edition that contains a DVD featuring all of Orrico's music videos, with the exception of "Genuine."

Critical reception

AllMusic editor Jon O'Brien remarked that More to Life: The Best of Stacie Orrico "cherrypicks the best 14 tracks from her three studio LPs, revealing that her blend of soulful R&B, melodic pop/rock, and spiritual lyrics deserved to achieve much bigger success than her measly two Billboard Hot 100 entries suggest." He found that "this greatest hits shows that mainstream Christian music doesn't have to begin and end with hard rock."

Track listing

Charts

Release history

References

2007 greatest hits albums
Stacie Orrico compilation albums
Music video compilation albums
2007 video albums